The Glazov Glacier (lednik Glazov) is a glacier in Novaya Zemlya, Arkhangelsk Oblast, Russia.

Two new islands and two headlands have been exposed in the area of the mouth of the fjord as a result.

Geography
The Glazov Glacier is located on the western side of northern Severny Island of Novaya Zemlya. It is a tidewater glacier flowing from the Severny Island ice cap in a roughly southeast–northwest direction.

 high Mount Kruzenshtern, the highest point of Novaya Zemlya, rises on the northern side of the head of the Glazov Glacier.

See also
List of glaciers in Europe
List of glaciers in Russia

Further reading
J. J. Zeeberg, Climate and Glacial History of the Novaya Zemlya Archipelago, Russian Arctic. Purdue University Press (January 1, 2002)

References

External links
Changes in glacier extent on north Novaya Zemlya
Hydrographers of the Northern Fleet in 2015 filled in the "blank spots" on the Arctic map (in Russian)

Glaciers of Russia
Novaya Zemlya

ceb:Lednik Glazov